= Lauckport, West Virginia =

Lauckport
- Unincorporated community
- Location within the state of West Virginia Lauckport (the United States)
- Coordinates: 39°15′12″N 81°34′13″W
- Country: United States
- State: West Virginia
- County: Wood
- Elevation: 633 ft (193 m)
- Time zone: UTC-5 (Eastern (EST))
  - Summer (DST): UTC-4 (EDT)
- GNIS ID: 1560595

Lauckport is an unincorporated community in Wood County, West Virginia, United States.

The community most likely derives its name from the local Lauck family.
